Broken String may refer to:

 Broken string, in the process of tripping pipe
 The Broken String, a 2007 book of poetry by Grace Schulman
 "The Broken String", a 2013 short story by Diane Chamberlain
 The Broken String, a Dutch documentary series based on the 1911 book Specimens of Bushman Folklore
 The Broken String: The Last Words of an Extinct People, short-listed for the 2004 John Llewellyn Rhys Prize

See also
 Bishop Allen & The Broken String, a 2007 album by Bishop Allen and the Broken String
 Song of the Broken String: After the ǀXam Bushmen, a 1991 book of poetry by Stephen Watson
 The Broken String Band, an American folk rock band